Michael 'Mike' Cagney is an American entrepreneur. He is the co-founder and CEO of financial services company Figure Technologies, a member of the founding team of Provenance Blockchain and the co-founder and former CEO of SoFi. Cagney is also co-founder and was the managing member of hedge fund Cabezon Investment Group.

Career
Cagney grew up in Southern California and received a degree in applied economics from the University of California, Santa Cruz. In the 1990s, Cagney worked as a trader with Wells Fargo before leaving in 2000 to start Finaplex, a wealth management software company that was acquired by Broadridge Financial Solutions. He then founded Cabezon Investment Group, a global macro hedge fund that manages money from family offices, before taking a Sloan Fellowship at Stanford University’s Graduate School of Business in 2010.

In 2011, Cagney and four fellow graduate students at Stanford Graduate School of Business created SoFi as a way to lower loan costs while providing a way for alumni to invest in students. Stanford ran a pilot SoFi program, seeded with $2 million from 40 alumni and disbursed to 100 graduate business students. By 2013, the company had funded $200 million in loans to 2,500 borrowers at 100 eligible schools. By 2015, the company was offering mortgages in more than 20 states and had funded more than $4 billion in loans.

In 2016, Cagney was named to Business Insider’s Creators list of top 100 business visionaries creating value for the world. By 2017, SoFi had a valuation of over $4 billion and had extended more than $20 billion in loans. The company had also expanded its services to include mortgages, personal loans, wealth management services and life insurance.

In September 2017, Cagney left SoFi after several workplace controversies, including allegations of sexual misconduct and presiding over a toxic work environment. At the time of his resignation, Cagney said that the litigation and ensuing media coverage made his presence a distraction to the company’s mission.

In 2018, Cagney and his wife, June Ou, co-founded fin-tech startup Figure Technologies, which creates and packages financial assets. As of 2019, the company had raised over $225 million and was valued at $1.2 billion. By 2020, the company had funded loans in excess of $1 billion, and begun offering securitizations backed by Home Equity Lines of Credit (HELOC), including the largest bond backed by a HELOC in over a decade. In August 2021, Figure Technologies agreed to merge with mortgage lender Homebridge Financial Services.

References

External links 
 

21st-century American businesspeople
American technology chief executives
American technology company founders
Living people
Year of birth missing (living people)